Look at Me Now may refer to:

 Look at Me Now (Bernie Marsden album), 1981
 Look at Me Now! (Dick Haymes album), 1957
 "Look at Me Now" (Bryan White song), 1994
 "Look at Me Now" (Chris Brown song), 2011
 "Look at Me Now", a song by Sixwire from Sixwire, 2002
 "Look at Me Now", a song by Breed 77 from In My Blood (En Mi Sangre), 2006
 "Look at Me Now", a song by Caroline Polachek from Pang, 2019
 "Look at Me Now", a song by the Electric Light Orchestra from The Electric Light Orchestra, 1971
 "Look at Me Now", a song by Gucci Mane from Delusions of Grandeur, 2019
 "Look at Me Now", a song by Iyaz from Replay, 2010
 "Look at Me Now", a song by Wang Chung from Points on the Curve, 1983
 "Look at Me Now", a song by Young Buck from Straight Outta Cashville, 2004
 "Look At Me Now", a song by miwa from DAITAN!, 2020

See also
 Look at Her Now, a 2019 song by Selena Gomez
 Look at Me (disambiguation)